The 1946 Iowa State Teachers Panthers football team represented Iowa State Teachers College in the North Central Conference (NCC) during the 1946 college football season. In its ninth season under head coach Clyde Starbeck, the team compiled a 4–1–2 record (2–0–1 against NCC opponents), shut out it final four opponents, won the NCC championship, and outscored opponent by a total of 175 to 32.

Iowa Teachers ranked third nationally in total defense among small college teams, giving up an average of only 108.5 yards per game.

Five players were selected to the all-conference team: ends Nick Avelchas and Cy Bellock; halfbacks Pudge Camarata and Bob Williams; tackle Jason Loving; and guard Paul Salzman.

Schedule

References

Iowa State Teachers
Northern Iowa Panthers football seasons
North Central Conference football champion seasons
Iowa State Teachers Panthers football